During the 2003–04 English football season, Mansfield Town Football Club competed in the Football League Third Division where they finished in 5th position with 75 points, reaching the 2004 Football League Third Division play-off Final where they lost on penalties to Huddersfield Town.

Final league table

Results
Mansfield Town's score comes first

Legend

Football League Third Division

Football League Third Division play-offs

FA Cup

League Cup

Football League Trophy

Squad statistics

References
General
Mansfield Town 2003–04 at soccerbase.com (use drop down list to select relevant season)

Specific

Mansfield Town F.C. seasons
Mansfield Town